Lotisma trigonana is a moth in the Copromorphidae family. It is found along the Pacific coast of North America, from Alaska to Costa Rica.

The wingspan is 14–22 mm. The forewings are brown with a pale diagonal stripe and with a pale brown apical half. The hindwings are pale brown. Adults are on wing year round in the southern part of the range.

The larvae feed on Gaultheria shallon, but have also been recorded feeding on cranberry.

Subspecies
Lotisma trigonana trigonana
Lotisma trigonana durangoensis Heppner, 1986 (Mexico: Durango)

References

Natural History Museum Lepidoptera generic names catalog

Copromorphidae
Moths described in 1879